Charlie Warde (born 1974) is a British painter.

Early life and family 
Charlie Warde, is a London-based artist born in Hammersmith, London.

Notable works 
Memorandum (Robin Hood Gardens) gold plated etched copper plate created in an edition of nine, with number one of the edition acquired by the V&A Museum for its permanent collection.

References

1974 births
Living people
British male painters
20th-century British male artists